Agoncillo may refer to:

Places
Agoncillo, La Rioja, a municipality in La Rioja, Spain
CD Agoncillo, Spanish football team based in Agoncillo
Logroño-Agoncillo Airport
Agoncillo, Batangas, a municipality in the Province of Batangas, Philippines

Other uses
Agoncillo (surname)